Anthracite Fields is an oratorio for choir and chamber ensemble by the American composer Julia Wolfe.  The work was commissioned by the Mendelssohn Club with contributions from New Music USA and was premiered by Bang on a Can All Stars and the Mendelssohn Club Chorus in Philadelphia, April 26, 2014.  It was awarded the 2015 Pulitzer Prize for Music.

The oratorio commemorates the history of the Northeastern Pennsylvania Coal Region in what the Pulitzer Prize citation described as "a powerful oratorio for chorus and sextet evoking Pennsylvania coal-mining life around the turn of the 20th Century."  Music critic Mark Swed of the Los Angeles Times praised the composition as "an unforgettably haunting, harrowing evocation of the plight of Pennsylvania's coal miners, incorporating many musical styles and effectively shadowy visuals."

Background

Anthracite is a form of coal that can be used for domestic fuel. The name of this oratorio, Anthracite Fields is a tribute to those who “persevered and endured in the Pennsylvania Anthracite coal region.”

The entire piece consists of five movements:

This movement honors those who died in mining accidents in Pennsylvania from 1869 to 1916. Wolfe intended to sing the names of victims but was alarmed by the amount. She decided to shorten the list by only including those with the first name "John" then a last name with one syllable.

This movement is a tribute to the breaker boys: boys who were working in Pennsylvania mines and removed coal from coal breakers. The movement uses cowbell and bicycle pedals to portray the sound of coal falling into the breakers and uses the rhythm to encompass more of a 'rock feel' to the piece.

In this movement, Julia Wolfe uses a speech by John L. Lewis who fought for safe working conditions for these miners.

This movement was created and inspired by an interview conducted with Barbara Powell, the daughter and granddaughter of miners. In an interview, she stated, “We all had gardens” and began listing flower names.

The words used in this movement were taken from a coal-powered railroad ad; coal during the 20th century was a fuel source for the nation, and this is the movement's theme. The movement ends with the story of Phoebe Snow, a historical railway advertising character, traveling to Buffalo while her "gown stays white from morn till night" – a quote from the railway company's advertising campaign.

Composition
Anthracite Fields runs approximately an hour and combines elements of folk and classical music.  Its libretto contains various oral histories, speeches, interviews, advertisements, and other texts from the history of the region.  On her inspiration and research for the composition, Wolfe wrote:

References

Compositions by Julia Wolfe
2014 compositions
Pulitzer Prize for Music-winning works
Chamber music compositions
Oratorios
21st-century classical music
Music commissioned by the Mendelssohn Club